Alexandra Mueller and Asia Muhammed were the defending champions, but Muhammed chose not to participate. Mueller partners up with Julia Glushko.
Canadians Sharon Fichman and Marie-Ève Pelletier defeated Shuko Aoyama and Gabriela Dabrowski 6–2, 7–5 in the final.

Seeds

Draw

Draw

References
 Main Draw

Cooper Challenger - Doubles
Waterloo Challenger